Gardiner Coit Means (June 8, 1896 in Windham, Connecticut – February 15, 1988 in Vienna, Virginia) was an American economist who worked at Harvard University, where he met lawyer-diplomat Adolf A. Berle. Together they wrote the seminal work of corporate governance, The Modern Corporation and Private Property.  During the New Deal, Means served as an economic adviser to Franklin D. Roosevelt and Henry A. Wallace.

Academic work
Means followed the institutionalist tradition of economists. In 1934 he coined term "administered prices" to refer to prices set by firms in monopoly positions. In The Corporate Revolution in America (1962) he wrote:

"We now have single corporate enterprises employing hundreds of thousands of workers, having hundreds of thousands of stockholders, using billions of dollars' worth of the instruments of production, serving millions of customers, and controlled by a single management group. These are great collectives of enterprise, and a system composed of them might well be called "collective capitalism."

Means argued that where an economy is fueled by big firms it is the interests of management, not the public, that govern society.

Bibliography
 The Modern Corporation and Private Property with Adolf A. Berle (1932)
 "Industrial Prices and their Relative Inflexibility" (1935)
 Patterns of Resource Use (1938)
 The Structure of the American Economy (1939)
 Pricing Power and the Public Interest (1962)
 The Corporate Revolution in America (1962)
 "Simultaneous Inflation and Unemployment: Challenge to theory and policy" (1975)

 A Monetary Theory of Employment 1994.

See also
Administered prices
History of economic thought

References

External links 

20th-century American economists
1896 births
1988 deaths
Harvard University faculty
Harvard University alumni